The Jordan Maritime Authority (JMA) is a government agency with the responsibility of governing the Red Sea and domestic ports, sea roads and shipping of Jordan.  It was established in 2002 by Royal Decree and functions in conjunction with the Ministry of Transport.  It is headquartered in Aqaba.

See also
 Politics of Jordan
 Transport in Jordan

References

External links
 

Ministry of Transport (Jordan)
Transport in Jordan
Red Sea
Port authorities
Maritime transport authorities
Government agencies established in 2002
Aqaba